The 2015 Canoe Marathon European Championships were the twelfth edition of the Canoe Marathon European Championships, which took place between 1 and 5 July 2015 at Bohinj, Slovenia. The competition consisted of sixteen events – ten in kayak and six in canoe – divided in junior, under-23 and senior categories.

Medalists

Juniors

Under 23

Seniors

Medal table

References

External links
 

Canoe Marathon European Championships
Canoe Marathon European Championships
International sports competitions hosted by Slovenia
Marathon European Championships
Canoeing in Slovenia